Ryan Lee Goward (born 1 November 1989) is an English footballer who is currently a free agent after spells with Mansfield Town, Glapwell, Carlton Town and Rainworth Miners Welfare.

Career

Mansfield Town
Goward came through the youth scheme at Mansfield and made his debut appearance for Mansfield as a 55th-minute substitute against Barnet in October 2007. After Mansfield Town were relegated to the Football Conference at the end of the 2007–08 season, he signed a new one-year contract. Before his contract was not renewed one season later, Goward went out on loan to Glapwell in January 2009.

Later career
Since leaving Mansfield, Goward has had permanent transfers at Glapwell, Carlton Town and Rainworth Miners Welfare.

References

External links

1989 births
Living people
Footballers from Mansfield
English footballers
Association football wingers
Mansfield Town F.C. players
Glapwell F.C. players
Carlton Town F.C. players
Rainworth Miners Welfare F.C. players
English Football League players
Northern Premier League players